Tetla is a town in Raigarh district, Chhattisgarh, India.

Geography
It is located at an altitude of 224 m above MSL.

Location
National Highway 200 passes through Tetla. It is about 12 km south of Raigarh. The nearest airport is Raipur Airport, and the nearest railway station is at Raigarh.

References

External links
 About Tetla

Cities and towns in Raigarh district